Ornidia  is a small genus of small (2.3–4.2 mm) metallic hoverflies.

All are endemic to the New World. With Ornidia obesa, which is widespread in the Americas, having spread into the Pacific and across the Orient and to the east coast of Africa aided by human activity.

Species
Ornidia aemula (Williston, 1888)
Ornidia major Curran, 1930
Ornidia obesa (Fabricius, 1775)
Ornidia therezinhae Carvalho Filho & Esposito, 2009
Ornidia whiteheadi Thompson, 1991

References

Diptera of South America
Diptera of North America
Diptera of Asia
Diptera of Africa
Hoverfly genera
Eristalinae
Taxa named by Amédée Louis Michel le Peletier
Taxa named by Jean Guillaume Audinet-Serville